The Balamand Monastery (historically called Belmont, Bellimontis ultra Mare, or Bellus-Mons), is a monastery for the Greek Orthodox Church of Antioch founded in 1157 in Balamand (Belmont), the Crusader County of Tripoli, now in the Koura District, in Northern Lebanon. It was originally started by Cistercian monks and maintained as such until the Mamluk conquest in 1289, then reestablished as monastery by Greek Orthodox monks in 1610, after a poorly documented period of three centuries.

On the grounds of the monastery has been established the University of Balamand, founded by the Orthodox Patriarch Ignatius IV of Antioch in 1988, though the university claims to be secular and a distinct institution.

History

Local legend in Lebanon reports that when Bohemond VII of Antioch escaped Latakia after it was taken by Qalawun in 1287, he hid in the village of Toula, Batroun, in the Northern Lebanese mountains. Legend has it that he lived there for a while, and produced offspring, from which the Prince, Conte, Zeeni and Aboujaoude families claim descent. The Balamand Monastery in Batroun is reputed a gift of the Prince's family, and now hosts the major University of Balamand, Balamand being a local adaptation of Bohemond.

See also
Balamand declaration

References 

 Louis J. Lekai: The Cistercians: Ideals and Reality, Kent State University Press, 1977. .

External links 
 Official page
 Official page

Eastern Orthodox monasteries in Lebanon
Greek Orthodox monasteries
Greek Orthodox Church of Antioch
1157 establishments in Asia
Cistercian monasteries
County of Tripoli
Religious organizations established in the 1150s
Christian monasteries established in the 12th century
1150s in the Crusader states